Péter Besenyei (born 1956) is a Hungarian aerobatics pilot and world champion air racer.

Biography
He was born on 8 June 1956 in Körmend, Hungary. He lived near the airport of Budapest and became interested in flying when he was a child. From watching 1962 World Aerobatic Championships he decided to become a pilot. At 15 years of age he flew a glider for the first time. In 1976 Péter entered his first flying competition by piloting a glider and showed his talent, finishing in second place.

Besenyei became an aerobatics pilot and won several titles in national and international championships. He won his first gold medal in 1982 at the Austrian National Championships. His specialty is free-style aerobatics. He invented a number of original snap rolls and, in 1984, the "knife-edge spin". In 1995 Péter Besenyei won 2 gold and 2 silver medals and he was named the most successful aerobatics pilot of his time. In 2001 Besenyei flew upside down under the Széchenyi Chain Bridge, that spans the river Danube in Budapest, a maneuver that became a standard in air races today.

Besenyei is sometimes referred to as the godfather of the Red Bull Air Race World Championship because of his work helping develop it. He was asked, in 2001 by Austrian energy-drink company Red Bull, to help develop the concept of an air racing competition. With enthusiasm he helped set up the rules and regulations and carefully selected the most daring pilots, with skills and courage, to handle the extreme physical and mental challenges of the air race. The first race was held in 2003 in Zeltweg, Austria. After two years the competition became a worldwide organization of Red Bull Air Race World Series.

He is currently a test pilot for the Hungarian Aviation Office and a flying instructor for aerobatic pilots on Zivko Edge 540. Péter enjoys car racing, skiing, sky diving, fishing, and photography. Besenyei retired from the Red Bull Air Race at the completion of the 2015 season.

Achievements
1982
 Austrian National Championships – overall winner
1990
 World Aerobatics Championships – 2nd
1993
 Breitling Aerobatics World Cup - 3rd
1994	
 World Champion of the Compulsory Program
1995	
 European Champion Freestyle		
 European Champion of the Compulsory Program
1998	
 FAI World Grand Prix Series 1st		
2000	
 World Champion Freestyle		
2001	
 FAI World Grand Prix Series 1st
2003	
 Tokyo, Japan - 1st
2005	
 FAI World Series Grand Prix, Lausanne, Switzerland - 1st

Honors

 1996 - "Gold Medal of the President of the Republic of Hungary" by President Árpád Göncz

Legend:
 CAN: Cancelled
 DNP: Did not participate
 DNS: Did not start
 DSQ: Disqualified
 NC: Not classified

See also
 Jurgis Kairys
 Competition aerobatics

References

External links

Péter Besenyei Official Site
Péter Besenyei (Official Fan Page) 
Biography at Budapest Pocket Guide website
Red Bull Air Race World Series official website
Aerobatics website with Péter Besenyei videos
The Story of Péter Besenyei on Youtube
The Story of Air Show Unawatuna Beach, Sri Lanka

1956 births
Living people
Hungarian aviators
Hungarian air racers
Red Bull Air Race World Championship pilots
Red Bull Air Race World Championship winners
Aerobatic pilots
People from Körmend
Sportspeople from Vas County